Sarah Persse (died 1927) was an Irish suffragist.

Persse was a member of the Persse Distillery family of Galway, and a relation of Lady Gregory. She was born and lived in Glenarde, Galway. Her parents were Henry Stratford (1838-1900), manager of the distillery at Nun's Island, and Eleanor Persse. Persse was the third eldest of ten children. In 1899 she was one of two women candidates in the west and south ward of Galway's Poor Law Unions. She withdrew from consideration as a Poor Law Guardian a day before the elections owing to the death of her father in 1900, and did not contest any future election. When her brother and his family moved into the Persse family home, she settled in London. She died there in 1927.

See also
 Emily Anderson
 Mary Donovan O'Sullivan
 Florence Moon
 Mary Fleetwood Berry

References

People from County Galway
Irish suffragists

1927 deaths
Year of birth missing